Panama and the Canal from an Aeroplane is a 1914 silent actuality film taken by pilot Robert G. Fowler and cameraman Ray Duhem on April 27, 1913. Fowler was making the first nonstop trans-Panama flight, Pacific-to-Atlantic, in an aeroplane and took along Duhem and his film camera. They flew over the still uncompleted Panama Canal and filmed scenes that later got them in trouble with the Department of War because they showed military fortifications in construction.

Cast
Robert G. Fowler
Ray Duhem

References

External links
The Panama and the Canal from an Aeroplane at IMDb.com
 Reel 4 of the film at the Internet Archive

1914 films
American black-and-white films
American silent films
1910s American films